Remote Control is a 2021 science fiction novella by Nigerian American Nnedi Okorafor. It is Okorafor's first novella after the Binti Trilogy and is set in the same universe as Okorafor's Who Fears Death and The Book of Phoenix.

It was a finalist for the 2021 Goodreads Choice Awards for Best Science Fiction and the Locus Awards.

Writing process  
Okorafor wrote the book during the COVID-19 pandemic, stating in an interview that travel disruptions due to the pandemic made her focus her energy on writing and editing the book. The events in the book takes place before the events in The Book of Phoenix and Who Fears Death.

Themes   
The book has been noted as a coming-of-age story, exploring themes such as solitude, grief, and what it means to be normal. The book is an Africanfuturist novella.

Reception 
Writing for NPR, Jason Heller described the novel as "a cumulative narrative, a slow burn that builds in emotional urgency even as the scope of Okorafor's worldbuilding bursts into something breathtakingly vast."

Writing for New Scientist, Layal Liverpool stated that "Remote Control is thrilling and surprising all the way through." Samantha Nelson of The A.V. Club, however, stated that "Sankofa is a fascinating character, but one whose legend isn’t quite compelling enough to take hold in our world."

References

External links
 

Nigerian science fiction novels
2021 science fiction novels
Works by Nnedi Okorafor
Novels set in Ghana
2021 Nigerian novels
Africanfuturist novels
Tor Books books